Hararati Power Station ( – Nīrūgāh-e Ḩarāratī; also known as Nīrūgāh-e Ḩarāratī-ye Tabrīz) is a village and power station in Lahijan Rural District, Khosrowshahr District, Tabriz County, East Azerbaijan Province, Iran. At the 2006 census, its population was 658, in 183 families.

References 

Populated places in Tabriz County